The Black Camel (1929) is the fourth of the Charlie Chan novels by Earl Derr Biggers.

Plot summary

It tells the story of a Hollywood star (Shelah Fane), who is stopping in Hawaii after she finished shooting a film on location in Tahiti.  She is murdered in the pavilion of her rental house in Waikiki during her stay.  The story behind her murder is linked with the three-year-old murder of another Hollywood actor and also connected with an enigmatic psychic named Tarneverro.  Chan, in his position as a detective with the Honolulu Police Department, "investigates amid public clamor demanding that the murderer be found and punished immediately.  "Death is a black camel that kneels unbidden at every gate. Tonight black camel has knelt here", Chan tells the suspects."

Film, TV or theatrical adaptations
It was adapted into a film of the same name based on the book and released in 1931.  This was the second of a series of sixteen Chan films to feature Warner Oland as the sleuth.

References

2. In Robert A. Heinlein's 1970 novel I Will Fear No Evil, the kneeling black camel reference is employed as a euphemism for death near the start of chapter 2.

3. In Robert A. Heinlein's first published work, a short story called "Lifeline", Dr. Pinero says "I can tell you when the Black Camel will kneel at your door."

External links
 
The Black Camel Film details at The Charlie Chan Family Home

1929 American novels
Charlie Chan novels
Novels set in Hawaii
American novels adapted into films
Bobbs-Merrill Company books